Hohenschönhausen was a borough of Berlin, that existed from 1985 until Berlin's 2001 administrative reform. It comprised the localities of Alt-Hohenschönhausen (the core of the borough), Neu-Hohenschönhausen, Malchow, Wartenberg and Falkenberg.

Overview
It was created by splitting the localities of Hohenschönhausen, Wartenberg, Falkenberg and the eastern part of Malchow off the 1920 Weißensee borough. In 2001 it was absorbed by the borough of Lichtenberg. The locality of Hohenschönhausen was then renamed Alt-Hohenschönhausen while the housing estates of Wartenberg, Falkenberg and Malchow form the Neu-Hohenschönhausen locality.

Culture
Alt-Hohenschönhausen is home to the Hohenschönhausen Memorial Center on the site of a former Stasi prison. It is also the location of the large sports complex Sportforum Hohenschönhausen. 

Hohenschönhausen Castle is located in Alt-Hohenschönhausen. The Association Hohenschönhausen Castle cares for the restoration and cultural revitalization of this manor house and regularly organizes different events in the castle, such as exhibitions, readings, and concerts.

See also
Alt-Hohenschönhausen
Neu-Hohenschönhausen

References

External links

Former boroughs of Berlin
Lichtenberg